The first ministry of William III and Mary II involved a precarious and short lived balance between erstwhile opponents Halifax and Carmarthen, as William attempted to balance the Whigs to whom he owed his initial success with the Tories needed to maintain his position.

It was a very unsure period as no one knew if James would come back, or if the people would accept a new king.  Ultimately, the ministry collapsed under the weight of attack from Whigs against Halifax, who voluntarily withdrew.  Carmarthen remained in power.

The Ministry

English ministries
1680s in England
1689 establishments in England
1690s in England
1690 disestablishments in England
Ministries of William and Mary